The Ioachim Chronicle (ru: Иоакимовская Летопись), also spelled Joachim or Ioakim) is a chronicle discovered by the Russian historian Vasily Tatishchev in the 18th century. The chronicle is believed to be a 17th-century compilation of earlier sources describing events in the 10th and 11th centuries concerning the Novgorod Republic and Kievan Rus'.

The original chronicle was lost and the contents are known through Tatishchev's "History of Russia" (История Российская), although Tatishchev's historiograph is dubious since his later edition of his history or Russia is much more detailed than his earlier edition and is based on sources no longer, and some say never, extant.  Indeed, Tatishchev's sources are so problematic, that Iakov Solomonovich Lur'e wrote of "'Tatishchev information' (data found only in that historian.)" Be that as it may, Tatishchev concluded that the chronicle was written by Ioakim Korsunianin, the first bishop of Novgorod the Great (ca. 988–1030).  More recent studies indicate that the chronicle was more likely compiled by the Patriarch Joachim of Moscow (d. 1690).

References

17th-century history books
East Slavic chronicles